Mingiyan Valeryevich Beveyev (born 30 November 1995) is a Russian football player of Kalmyk origin who plays for FC Ural Yekaterinburg.

Club career
He made his debut in the Russian Professional Football League for FC MITOS Novocherkassk on 28 July 2015 in a game against FC Mashuk-KMV Pyatigorsk.

He made his debut for FC Ural Yekaterinburg on 25 September 2018 in a Russian Cup game against FC Neftekhimik Nizhnekamsk, as a starter.

On 2 June 2022, Beveyev returned to FC Ural Yekaterinburg after two seasons away. He made his Russian Premier League debut for Ural on 23 July 2022 against FC Orenburg.

Career statistics

References

External links
 
 

1995 births
Sportspeople from Kalmykia
Living people
Russian footballers
Association football defenders
FC Volgar Astrakhan players
FC Nosta Novotroitsk players
FC Ural Yekaterinburg players
FC Rotor Volgograd players
FC KAMAZ Naberezhnye Chelny players
FC Yenisey Krasnoyarsk players
Russian Second League players
Russian First League players
Russian Premier League players